Paramarbla is a genus of moths in the subfamily Lymantriinae. The genus was erected by Cyril Leslie Collenette in 1937.

Species
Paramarbla abyssinica Collenette, 1956 Ethiopia
Paramarbla ansorgei Collenette, 1960 Congo
Paramarbla azami (Kheil, 1909) Nigeria
Paramarbla beni (Bethune-Baker, 1909) Congo, Nigeria
Paramarbla catharia (Collenette, 1933) Uganda
Paramarbla coelebs (Collenette, 1931)
Paramarbla elegantula (Hering, 1926) Cameroon
Paramarbla hemileuca (Rebel, 1914) north-eastern Congo
Paramarbla indentata (Holland, 1893) western Africa
Paramarbla lindblomi (Aurivillius, 1922) eastern Africa
Paramarbla lutulenta (Collenette, 1931) western Africa
Paramarbla nyctemerina (Rebel, 1914) north-eastern Congo
Paramarbla tenera (Holland, 1893) western Africa
Paramarbla teroensis Collenette, 1937 Uganda

References

Lymantriinae